The Winchester is a public house at 206 Archway Road, Highgate, London N6.

In early 2016 locals campaigned to save the pub from a proposed residential redevelopment. While the campaign was successful, and the old building frontage remains undeveloped, The Winchester ceased operations as a pub in 2016, but reopened in 2022.

It was on the Campaign for Real Ale's National Inventory of Historic Pub Interiors.

It was built in 1881 as the Winchester Tavern, and it later became the Winchester Hall Hotel. The name derives from Winchester Hall, a nearby late 17th-century mansion.

The pub reopened in October 2022 with a 'soft launch'.

References

National Inventory Pubs
Highgate
Pubs in the London Borough of Camden